UK Independence Party leadership election may refer to:

2002 UK Independence Party leadership election
2006 UK Independence Party leadership election
2009 UK Independence Party leadership election
2010 UK Independence Party leadership election
September 2016 UK Independence Party leadership election
November 2016 UK Independence Party leadership election
2017 UK Independence Party leadership election
2018 UK Independence Party leadership election
2019 UK Independence Party leadership election
2020 UK Independence Party leadership election
2021 UK Independence Party leadership election